Exiguobacterium alkaliphilum is a Gram-positive, rod-shaped, facultatively anaerobic and alkaliphilic bacterium from the genus of Exiguobacterium which has been isolated from alkaline wastewater drained sludge from New Delhi.

References

 

Bacillaceae
Bacteria described in 2013